A non-fungible token (NFT) is a unique digital identifier that cannot be copied, substituted, or subdivided, that is recorded in a blockchain, and that is used to certify ownership and authenticity. The ownership of an NFT is recorded in the blockchain and can be transferred by the owner, allowing NFTs to be sold and traded. NFTs can be created by anybody, and require few or no coding skills to create. NFTs typically contain references to digital files such as photos, videos, and audio. Because NFTs are uniquely identifiable assets, they differ from cryptocurrencies, which are fungible. 

Proponents of NFTs claim that NFTs provide a public certificate of authenticity or proof of ownership, but the legal rights conveyed by an NFT can be uncertain. The ownership of an NFT as defined by the blockchain has no inherent legal meaning and does not necessarily grant copyright, intellectual property rights, or other legal rights over its associated digital file. An NFT does not restrict the sharing or copying of its associated digital file and does not prevent the creation of NFTs that reference identical files.

The NFT market grew dramatically from 2020 to 2021: the trading of NFTs in 2021 increased to more than $17 billion, up by 21,000% over 2020's total of $82 million. NFTs have been used as speculative investments and they have drawn increasing criticism for the energy cost and carbon footprint associated with validating blockchain transactions as well as their frequent use in art scams. The NFT market has also been compared to an economic bubble or a Ponzi scheme. In 2022, the NFT market suffered a major collapse, with prices sharply falling; a May 2022 estimate was that the number of sales was down over 90% compared to its 2021 peak.

Characteristics
An NFT is a unit of data, stored on a type of digital ledger called a blockchain, which can be sold and traded. The NFT can be associated with a particular digital or physical asset such as images, art, music, and sports highlights and may confer licensing rights to use the asset for a specified purpose. An NFT (and, if applicable, the associated license to use, copy, or display the underlying asset) can be traded and sold on digital markets. The extralegal nature of NFT trading usually results in an informal exchange of ownership over the asset that has no legal basis for enforcement, and so often confers little more than use as a status symbol.

NFTs function like cryptographic tokens, but unlike cryptocurrencies such as Bitcoin or Ethereum, NFTs are not mutually interchangeable, and so are not fungible. NFTs are created when blockchains concatenate records containing cryptographic hashes—sets of characters that identify a set of data—onto previous records, creating a chain of identifiable data blocks. This cryptographic transaction process ensures the authentication of each digital  by providing a digital signature that tracks NFT ownership. Data links that are part of NFT records, that for example may point to details about where the associated art is stored, can be affected by link rot.

Copyright

An NFT solely represents a proof of ownership of a blockchain record and does not necessarily imply that the owner possesses intellectual property rights to the digital asset the NFT purports to represent. Someone may sell an NFT that represents their work, but the buyer will not necessarily receive copyright to that work, and the seller may not be prohibited from creating additional NFT copies of the same work. According to legal scholar Rebecca Tushnet, "In one sense, the purchaser acquires whatever the art world thinks they have acquired. They definitely do not own the copyright to the underlying work unless it is explicitly transferred."

Certain NFT projects, such as Bored Apes, explicitly assign intellectual property rights of individual images to their respective owners. The NFT collection CryptoPunks was a project that initially prohibited owners of its NFTs from using the associated digital artwork for commercial use, but later allowed such use upon acquisition of the collection's parent company.

History
The first known "NFT", Quantum, was created by Kevin McCoy and Anil Dash in May 2014. It consists of a video clip made by McCoy's wife, Jennifer. McCoy registered the video on the Namecoin blockchain and sold it to Dash for $4, during a live presentation for the Seven on Seven conferences at the New Museum in New York City. McCoy and Dash referred to the technology as "monetized graphics". This explicitly linked a non-fungible, tradable blockchain marker to a work of art, via on-chain metadata (enabled by Namecoin). This is in contrast to the multi-unit, fungible, metadata-less "Colored Coins" of other blockchains and Counterparty.

In October 2015, the first NFT project, Etheria, was launched and demonstrated at DEVCON 1 in London, Ethereum's first developer conference, three months after the launch of the Ethereum blockchain. Most of Etheria's 457 purchasable and tradable hexagonal tiles went unsold for more than five years until March 13, 2021, when renewed interest in NFTs sparked a buying frenzy. Within 24 hours, all tiles of the current version and a prior version, each hardcoded to 1 ETH ( at the time of launch), were sold for a total of  million.

The term "NFT" only achieved wider usage with the ERC-721 standard, first proposed in 2017 via the Ethereum GitHub, following the launch of various NFT projects that year. The standard coincided with the launch of several NFT projects, including Curio Cards, CryptoPunks (a project to trade unique cartoon characters, released by the American studio Larva Labs on the Ethereum blockchain), and rare Pepe trading cards.

The 2017 online game CryptoKitties was made profitable by selling tradable cat NFTs, and its success brought public attention to NFTs.

The NFT market experienced rapid growth during 2020, with its value tripling to  million. In the first three months of 2021, more than  million were spent on NFTs.

In 2020, the U.S Patent and Trademark Office received three trademark applications for NFTs. In 2021, the number of trademark applications jumped to more than 1200. In January 2022, the U.S. Patent and Trademark Office received 450 NFT-related trademark applications.  The growing list of brands being trademarked for NFTs includes the NYSE, Star Trek, Panera, Walmart, Elvis Presley, Sports Illustrated, Ticketmaster, and Yahoo. In the early months of 2021, interest in NFTs increased after a number of high-profile sales and art auctions.

In May 2022, The Wall Street Journal reported that the NFT market was "collapsing". Daily sales of NFT tokens had declined 92% from September 2021, and the number of active wallets in the NFT market fell 88% from November 2021. While rising interest rates had impacted risky bets across the financial markets, the Journal said "NFTs are among the most speculative."

Uses

Commonly associated files
NFTs have been used to exchange digital tokens that link to a digital file asset. Ownership of an NFT is often associated with a license to use such a linked digital asset but generally does not confer the copyright to the buyer. Some agreements only grant a license for personal, non-commercial use, while other licenses also allow commercial use of the underlying digital asset. This kind of decentralized intellectual copyright poses an alternative to established forms of safeguarding copyright controlled by state institutions and middlemen within the respective industry.

Digital art

Digital art is a common use case for NFTs. High-profile auctions of NFTs linked to digital art have received considerable public attention. The work entitled Merge by artist Pak was the most expensive NFT, with an auction price of  million and Everydays: the First 5000 Days, by artist Mike Winkelmann (known professionally as Beeple) the second most expensive at  million in 2021.

Some NFT collections, including Bored Apes, EtherRocks, and CryptoPunks are examples of generative art, where many different images are created by assembling a selection of simple picture components in different combinations.

In March 2021, the blockchain company Injective Protocol bought a $95,000 original screen print entitled Morons (White) from English graffiti artist Banksy, and filmed somebody burning it with a cigarette lighter. They uploaded (known as "minting" in the NFT scene) and sold the video as an NFT. The person who destroyed the artwork, who called themselves "Burnt Banksy", described the act as a way to transfer a physical work of art to the NFT space.

American curator and art historian Tina Rivers Ryan, who specializes in digital works, said that art museums are widely not convinced that NFTs have "lasting cultural relevance." Ryan compares NFTs to the net art fad before the dot-com bubble. In July 2022, after the controversial sale of Michelangelo's Doni Tondo in Italy, the sale of NFT reproductions of famous artworks was prohibited in Italy. Given the complexity and lack of regulation of the matter, the Ministry of Culture of Italy temporarily requested that its institutions refrain from signing contracts involving NFTs.

No centralized means of authentication exists to prevent stolen and counterfeit digital works from being sold as NFTs, although auction houses like Sotheby's, Christie's, and various museums and galleries worldwide started collaborations and partnerships with digital artists such as Refik Anadol, Dangiuz and Sarah Zucker. 

NFTs associated with digital artworks could be sold and bought via NFT platforms. OpenSea, launched in 2017, was one of the first marketplaces to host various types of NFTs. In July 2019, the National Basketball Association, the NBA Players Association and Dapper Labs, the creator of CryptoKitties, started a joint venture NBA Top Shot for basketball fans that let users buy NFTs of historic moments in basketball. In 2020, Rarible was found, allowing multiple assets. In 2021, Rarible and Adobe formed a partnership to simplify the verification and security of metadata for digital content, including NFTs. In 2021, a cryptocurrency exchange Binance, launched its NFT marketplace. In 2022, eToro Art by eToro was founded, focusing on supporting NFT collections and emerging creators.

Sotheby's and Christie's auction houses showcase artworks associated with the respective NFTs both in virtual galleries and physical screens, monitors, and TVs.

Mars House, an architectural NFT created in May 2020 by artist Krista Kim, sold in 2021 for 288 Ether (ETH)  at that time equivalent to US$524,558.

Games

NFTs play a role both in traditional as well as blockchainbased videogames. While in the former they usually represent cosmetic additions that can be ascribed to an individual player they are often at the very core of a blockchain game.

NFTs can represent in-game assets, such as digital plots of land. Some commentators describe these as being controlled "by the user" instead of the game developer if they can be traded on third-party marketplaces without permission from the game developer. Their reception from game developers, though, has been generally mixed, with some like Ubisoft embracing the technology but Valve and Microsoft formally prohibiting them.

 CryptoKitties was an early successful blockchain online game in which players adopt and trade virtual cats. The monetization of NFTs within the game raised a $12.5 million investment, with some kitties selling for over $100,000 each. Following its success, CryptoKitties was added to the ERC-721 standard, which was created in January 2018 (and finalized in June). A similar NFT-based online game, Axie Infinity, was launched in March 2018. The Sandbox is another example of one of many blockchainbased videgames that gained notoriety in the course of the bullrun of 2021. Since then several games of that sort have established themselves and have often used NFTs as part of their gameplay.
 In October 2021, Valve Corporation banned applications from their Steam platform if those applications use blockchain technology or NFTs to exchange value or game artifacts.
 In December 2021, Ubisoft announced Ubisoft Quartz, "an NFT initiative which allows people to buy artificially scarce digital items using cryptocurrency". The announcement was heavily criticized by audiences, with the Quartz announcement video attaining a dislike ratio of 96% on YouTube. Ubisoft would later unlist the video from YouTube. The announcement was also criticized internally by Ubisoft developers. The Game Developers Conference's 2022 annual report stated that 70 percent of developers surveyed said their studios had no interest in integrating NFTs or cryptocurrency into their games.
 Some luxury brands minted NFTs for online video game cosmetics. In November 2021, investment firm Morgan Stanley published a note claiming that this could become a US$56 billion dollar market by 2030.
 In July 2022, Mojang Studios announced that NFTs would not be permitted in Minecraft, saying that they went against the game's "values of creative inclusion and playing together".
 Rockstar Games has announced their decision to utilize NFTs in the newest Game of their Grand Theft Auto franchise.
 Start-up Sorare launched an Ethereum based NFT daily fantasy football game in 2019. It was one of the first attempts to gamify NFT collectibles. In 2022 they also added NBA fantasy and MLB fantasy games.

Music and film 
Within the film-industry, NFTs most importantly offer the ability to tokenize movie-scenes and sell them as collectibles in the form of NFTs. In the music-industry artists are able to gain more control over their artwork without interference by third-parties by using NFTs. Artists involved in one of or both segments of the entertainment-industry can use NFTs in order to make sure that they will receive royalties, to minimize both the financial impact as well as the relevance of pirated copies of their artworks as well as in order to engage in their art-form without influence by music-labels, film-studios or any other third-parties.
So far, NFTs have often been used in both the music- as well as the film-industry.
 In May 2018, 20th Century Fox partnered with Atom Tickets and released limited-edition Deadpool 2 digital posters to promote the film. They were available from OpenSea and the GFT exchange. 
 In March 2021 Adam Benzine's 2015 documentary Claude Lanzmann: Spectres of the Shoah became the first motion picture and documentary film to be auctioned as an NFT.
 Apart from these two examples there have been several other cases of NFTs being used in the film-industry. This includes, among other examples, the announcement about the release of an exclusive collection of NFT-artworks for Godzilla vs. Kong as well as Kevin Smith announcing in April 2021 the release of his horror-movie KillRoy Was Here as an NFT. The 2021 film Zero Contact, directed by Rick Dugdale and starring Anthony Hopkins, was also released as an NFT.
 In April 2021, an NFT associated with the score of the movie Triumph, composed by Gregg Leonard, was the first NFT minted for a feature film score.
 In November 2021, film director Quentin Tarantino released seven NFTs based on uncut scenes of Pulp Fiction. Miramax subsequently filed a lawsuit claiming that their film rights were violated and that the original 1993 contract with Tarantino gave them the right to mint NFTs in relation to Pulp Fiction.

By February 2021 NFTs accounted for  million of revenue generated through the sale of artwork and songs as NFTs. This trend has continued ever since in different degrees depending on the state of the market at the time, accounting for millions of Dollars monthly. On February 28, 2021, for example, electronic dance musician 3LAU sold a collection of 33 NFTs for a total of  million to commemorate the three-year anniversary of his Ultraviolet album. On March 3, 2021, an NFT was made to promote the Kings of Leon album When You See Yourself. Other musicians who have used NFTs include American rapper Lil Pump, Grimes, visual artist Shepard Fairey in collaboration with record producer Mike Dean, and rapper Eminem.

A paper presented at the 40th International Conference on Information Systems in Munich in 2019 suggested using NFTs as tickets for different types of events. This would enable organizers of the respective events or artists performing there to receive royalties on the resale of each ticket.

Other associated files
 A number of internet memes have been associated with NFTs, which were minted and sold by their creators or by their subjects. Examples include Doge, an image of a Shiba Inu dog, as well as Charlie Bit My Finger, Nyan Cat and Disaster Girl.
 Some virtual worlds, often marketed as metaverses, have incorporated NFTs as a means of trading virtual items and virtual real estate.
 Some pornographic works have been sold as NFTs, though hostility from NFT marketplaces towards pornographic material has presented significant drawbacks for creators. By using NFTs people engaged in this area of the entertainment-industry are able to publish their works without third-party platforms being able to delete them.
 The first credited political protest NFT ("Destruction of Nazi Monument Symbolizing Contemporary Lithuania") was a video filmed by Professor Stanislovas Tomas on April 8, 2019, and minted on March 29, 2021. In the video, Tomas uses a sledgehammer to destroy a state-sponsored Lithuanian plaque located on the Lithuanian Academy of Sciences honoring Nazi war criminal Jonas Noreika.
 In 2020, CryptoKitties developer Dapper Labs released the NBA TopShot project, which allowed the purchase of NFTs linked to basketball highlights. The project was built on top of the Flow blockchain.
 In March 2021 an NFT of Twitter founder Jack Dorsey's first-ever tweet sold for $2.9 million. The same NFT was listed for sale in 2022 at $48 million, but only achieved a top bid of $280.
 On December 15, 2022, former President of the United States Donald Trump announced a line of NFTs featuring art of himself for $99 each.

Use cases of NFTs in science and medicine 
Apart from being used in the context of the entertainment industry and as a means of financial speculation there have been many instances as well as suggestions of NFTs being used for purposes related to scientific and especially medical purposes. Those suggestions include minting patient data as NFTs, tracking supply chains using NFTs as well as minting patents as NFTs.

The monetary aspect of the sale of NFTs is often used by academic institutions to finance research projects and endavours.

 The University of California, Berkeley announced in May 2021 its intention to auction NFTs of two patents of inventions for which the creators had received a Nobel Prize: the patents for CRISPR gene editing and cancer immunotherapy. The university would however retain ownership of the patents. 85 % of funds gathered through the sale of the collection were to be used to finance research. The collection included handwritten notices and faxes by James Allison and was named The Fourth Pillar.
 George Church announced his intention to publish his DNA via NFT and use the profits made through its sale to finance research conducted by Nebula Genomics. In June 2022 20 NFTs with his likeness were published instead of the originally planned NFTs of his DNA due to the market conditions at the time. Despite leading to mixed reactions the project is considered to be part of an effort to use the genetic data of 15,000 individuals to support genetic research. By using NFTs the project wants to ensure that the users submitting their genetic data are able to receive direct payment for their contributions. Several other companies have been involved in similar and often critisized efforts to use blockchainbased genetic data in order to guarantee users more control over their data and enable them to receive direct financial compensation whenever their data is being sold.
 Molecule Protocol, a Web3-project based in Switzerland, is trying to use NFTs to digitalize the intellectual copyright of individual scientists as well as research teams and enable or simplify efforts to finance research through decentralized means. The project's whitepaper explains the reasons for and ways by which they are planning to mint the copyright of scientific papers as NFTs and enable their trade between researchers and investors on their future marketplace. The project was able to raise  million in seed money in July 2022. A similar approach has been announced by RMDS Lab.

Speculation
NFTs representing digital collectables and artworks are a speculative asset. The NFT buying surge was called an economic bubble by experts, who also compared it to the Dot-com bubble. In March 2021 Mike Winkelmann called NFTs an "irrational exuberance bubble". By mid-April 2021, demand subsided, causing prices to fall significantly. Financial theorist William J. Bernstein compared the NFT market to 17th-century tulip mania, saying any speculative bubble requires a technological advance for people to "get excited about", with part of that enthusiasm coming from the extreme predictions being made about the product. For regulatory policymakers, NFT has exacerbated challenges such as speculation, fraud, and high volatility.

Money laundering
NFTs, as with other blockchain securities and with traditional art sales, can potentially be used for money laundering. NFTs are often used to perform Wash Trading by creating several different wallets for one individual, generating several fictitious sales and consequently selling the respective NFT to a third party. According to a report by Chainalysis these types of wash trades are becoming increasingly popular among money launderers especially due to the largely anonymous nature of transactions on NFT marketplaces. These large sums were generated to large parts through wash trading. As stated in a report by the Royal United Services Institute any risks in relation to money laundering through NFTs could be mitigated through the use of "KYC best practices, strong cyber security measures and a stolen art registry (...) without restricting the growth of this new market".

Auction platforms for NFT sales may face regulatory pressure to comply with anti-money laundering legislation. Gou Wenjun, the director of the Anti-Money Laundering Monitoring and Analysis Centre for the People's Bank of China, expressed that NFTs could "easily become money-laundering tools." Gou elaborated that there is increasing unlawful exploitation of various new cryptographic technologies and that illicit actors often self-identify as innovators of the financial technology sector.

A February 2022 study from the United States Treasury assessed that there was "some evidence of money laundering risk in the high-value art market," including through "the emerging digital art market, such as the use of non-fungible tokens (NFTs)." The study considered how NFT transactions may be a simpler option for laundering money through art by avoiding the transportation or insurance complications in trading physical art. Several NFT exchanges were labeled as virtual asset service providers that may be subject to Financial Crimes Enforcement Network regulations. In March 2022, two people were charged for the execution of a $1,000,000 NFT scheme through wire fraud.

The European Union has yet to establish specific regulations to combat money laundering through NFTs. The European Commission announced in July 2022 that it is planning to draw regulations regarding that issue by 2024.

Other uses
 In 2019, Nike patented a system called CryptoKicks that would use NFTs to verify the authenticity of physical sneakers and would give a virtual version of the shoe to the customer.
 Some private online communities  of certain NFT releases.

Standards in blockchains
Specific token standards support various blockchain use cases. Ethereum was the first blockchain to support NFTs with its ERC-721 standard and this is currently the most widely used. Many other blockchains have added or plan to add support for NFTs.

ERC-721 was the first standard for representing non-fungible digital assets on the Ethereum blockchain. ERC-721 is an inheritable Solidity smart contract standard; "inheritable" means that developers can create new ERC-721-compliant contracts by copying from a reference implementation.

The ERC-1155 standard offers "semi-fungibility", as well as providing an analogue to ERC-721 functionality (meaning that an ERC-721 asset can be built using ERC-1155). Unlike ERC-721 where a unique ID represents a single asset, the unique ID of an ERC-1155 token represents a class of assets, and there is an additional quantity field to represent the amount of the class that a particular wallet has. Assets of the same class are interchangeable, and a user can transfer any amount of assets to others.

Issues and criticisms

Unenforceability of copyright

Because the contents of NFTs are publicly accessible, anybody can easily copy a file referenced by an NFT. Furthermore, the ownership of an NFT on the blockchain does not inherently convey legally enforceable intellectual property rights to the file.

It has become well known that an NFT image can be copied or saved from a web browser by using a right click menu to download the referenced image. NFT supporters disparage this duplication of NFT artwork as a "right-clicker mentality". One collector quoted by Vice compared the value of a purchased NFT (in contrast to an unpurchased copy of the underlying asset) to that of a status symbol "to show off that they can afford to pay that much".

The "right-clicker mentality" phrase spread virally after its introduction, particularly among those who were critical of the NFT marketplace and who appropriated the term to flaunt their ability to capture digital art backed by NFT with ease. This criticism was promoted by Australian programmer Geoffrey Huntley who created "The NFT Bay", modeled after The Pirate Bay. The NFT Bay advertised a torrent file purported to contain 19 terabytes of digital art NFT images. Huntley compared his work to an art project from Pauline Pantsdown and hoped the site would help educate users on what NFTs are and are not.

Storage off-chain
NFTs that represent digital art generally do not store the associated artwork file on the blockchain due to the large size of such a file, and the limited processing speed of blockchains. Such a token functions like a certificate of ownership, with a web address that points to the piece of art in question; this however makes the art itself vulnerable to link rot.

Environmental concerns

NFT purchases and sales are enabled by the high energy usage, and consequent greenhouse gas emissions, associated with blockchain transactions. Though all forms of Ethereum transactions have an impact on the environment, the direct impact of the transaction is also dependent upon the size of the Ethereum transaction. The proof-of-work protocol required to regulate and verify blockchain transactions on networks such as Ethereum consumes a large amount of electricity. To estimate the carbon footprint of a given NFT transaction requires a variety of assumptions or estimations about the manner in which that transaction is set up on the blockchain, the economic behavior of blockchain miners (and the energy demands of their mining equipment), and the amount of renewable energy being used on these networks. There are also conceptual questions, such as whether the carbon footprint estimate for an NFT purchase should incorporate some portion of the ongoing energy demand of the underlying network, or just the marginal impact of that particular purchase. An analogy might be the carbon footprint associated with an additional passenger on a given airline flight.

Some NFT technologies use validation protocols, such as proof of stake, that use much less energy per validation cycle. Other approaches to reducing electricity include the use of off-chain transactions as part of minting an NFT. A number of NFT art sites hope to address these concerns, and some are moving to technologies and protocols with lower associated footprints. Others now allow the option of buying carbon offsets when making NFT purchases, although the environmental benefits of this have been questioned. In some instances, NFT artists have decided against selling some of their own work to limit carbon emission contributions.

Artist and buyer fees
Sales platforms charge artists and buyers fees for minting, listing, claiming, and secondary sales. Those selling NFTs below $100 were paying platform fees between 72.5% and 157.5% of that amount. On average the fees make up 100.5% of the price, meaning that such artists were on average paying more money in fees than they were making in sales.

Plagiarism and fraud
There have been cases of artists and creators having their work sold by others as an NFT without permission. After the artist Qing Han died in 2020, her identity was assumed by a fraudster and a number of her works became available for purchase as NFTs. Similarly, a seller posing as Banksy succeeded in selling an NFT supposedly made by the artist for $336,000 in 2021; the seller refunded the money after the case drew media attention. In 2022, it was discovered that as part of their NFT marketing campaign, an NFT company that voice actor Troy Baker announced his partnership with had plagiarized voice lines generated from 15.ai, a free AI text-to-speech project.

The anonymity associated with NFTs and the ease with which they can be forged make it difficult to pursue legal action against NFT plagiarists.

In February 2023, artist Mason Rothschild was ordered to pay $133,000 in damages to Hermès by a New York court, after a jury sided with the copyright holder, for his 2021 digital depictions of the brand's Birkin handbag.

Some NFT marketplaces responded to cases of plagiarism by creating "takedown teams" to respond to artist complaints. The NFT marketplace OpenSea has rules against plagiarism and deepfakes (non-consensual intimate imagery). Some artists criticized OpenSea's efforts, saying they are slow to respond to takedown requests and that artists are subject to support scams from users who claim to be representatives of the platform. Others argue that there is no market incentive for NFT marketplaces to crack down on plagiarism.

 A process known as "sleepminting" allows a fraudster to mint an NFT in an artist's wallet and transfer it back to their own account without the artist becoming aware. This allowed a white hat hacker to mint a fraudulent NFT that had seemingly originated from the wallet of the artist Beeple.
 Plagiarism concerns led the art website DeviantArt to create an algorithm that compares user art posted on the DeviantArt website against art on popular NFT marketplaces. If the algorithm identifies art that is similar, it notifies and instructs the author how they can contact NFT marketplaces to request that they take down their plagiarized work.
 The BBC reported a case of insider trading when an employee of the NFT marketplace OpenSea bought specific NFTs before they were launched, with prior knowledge those NFTs would be promoted on the company's home page. NFT trading is an unregulated market in which there is no legal recourse for such abuses.
 When Adobe announced they were adding NFT support to their graphics editor Photoshop, the company proposed creating an InterPlanetary File System database as an alternative means of establishing authenticity for digital works.
 The price paid for specific NFTs and the sales volume of a particular NFT author may be artificially inflated by wash trading, which is prevalent due to a lack of government regulation on NFTs.

Security
In January 2022, it was reported that some NFTs were being exploited by sellers to unknowingly gather users’ IP addresses. The "exploit" works via the off-chain nature of NFT, as the user's computer automatically follows a web address in the NFT to display the content. The server at the address can then log the IP address and, in some cases, dynamically alter the returned content to show the result. OpenSea has a particular vulnerability to this loophole because it allows HTML files to be linked.

Pyramid/Ponzi scheme claims
Critics compare the structure of the NFT market to a pyramid or Ponzi scheme, in which early adopters profit at the expense of those buying in later. In June 2022, Bill Gates stated his belief that NFTs are "100% based on greater fool theory".

"Rug pull" exit scams
A "rug pull" is a scam, similar to an exit scam or a pump and dump scheme, in which the developers of an NFT or other blockchain project hype the value of a project to pump up the price and then suddenly sell all their tokens to lock in massive profits or otherwise abandon the project while removing liquidity, permanently destroying the value of the project.

See also
 Decentralized autonomous organization
 Web3

Notes

References

External links